Turleigh is a hamlet in west Wiltshire, England.

The Kennet and Avon Canal and Avoncliff railway station are below the hamlet in the river valley.


Urban development
Turleigh Manor is Grade II* listed and was established in the 17th or 18th century when both Winsley and Turleigh comprised stone houses dating from the previous three centuries. At this time, much of the land was the glebe land of the manor of Bradford Rectory. There was prosperity here in the 18th century, demonstrated by the extent of house building. These included Turleigh Grange (early 18th century), Stoneleigh, and Hill House (c.1740), originally two attached cottages. Many of the smaller houses in Turleigh were occupied by quarrymen, stonemasons and tanners.

From 1819 to 1885 there was a Baptist chapel at Turleigh Manor.

Notable people
John Daniel Heal, mayor of Brisbane, Queensland, was born at Turleigh in 1825. Moma Clarke (Maria Elvins Clarke, 1869–1958, journalist) lived in Turleigh for a while.

References

External links

 

Hamlets in Wiltshire